Evelyn Renee O'Connor (born February 15, 1971) is an American actress, producer, and director, known for the role of Gabrielle on the television series Xena: Warrior Princess.

Early life
Born in Houston, and raised in suburban Katy, Texas, by her mother Sandra, O'Connor at age 12 studied acting at the Alley Theatre in Houston, Texas. She attended Kinder High School for the Performing and Visual Arts in Houston, and made her professional debut as a dancing Porky Pig at that city's Six Flags AstroWorld. Afterward, she moved to Los Angeles, California, to pursue an acting career.

Career
She made her screen debut at 17, starring in the "Teen Angel" segment of the Disney Channel's The Mickey Mouse Club, and the subsequent Teen Angel TV series. She went on to the Disney film The Adventures of Huck Finn and TV-movies including Follow the River, Danielle Steele's Changes, and Hercules and the Lost Kingdom, starring Kevin Sorbo. There, in the role of Deianeira, she came to the attention of Hercules executive producers Rob Tapert and Sam Raimi, who cast her as Gabrielle in the spinoff TV series Xena: Warrior Princess.

In 2001, O'Connor began her own film production company, Roc Productions. The following year, she played Lady Macbeth in the Shakespeare by the Sea production of Macbeth.  She reprised the role in a House of Bards Theatre Company production in San Pedro, California, from October 11 to November 3, 2019. She played Nurse in the Southern Shakespeare Company's May 10–13, 2018, production of Romeo and Juliet alongside her 16-year-old son, Miles Muir.

Personal life
From 1998, O'Connor was in a relationship with restaurateur Steve Muir. Renee and Steve were married in 2000 and divorced in 2004. She has a son with Muir, Miles Muir, who was 16 years old as of May 2018.

Renee began a relationship with Jed Sura sometime prior to 2006. They have a daughter Iris Sura O'Connor, born March 19, 2006. Renee and Jed were married in 2017.

Filmography

Film

Television

Theatre

References

External links
 

20th-century American actresses
21st-century American actresses
Actresses from Texas
American child actresses
American film actresses
Film producers from Texas
American stage actresses
American television actresses
American television directors
American voice actresses
American women film directors
Film directors from Texas
Living people
People from Katy, Texas
American women television directors
High School for the Performing and Visual Arts alumni
American women film producers
1971 births